Stenarctia rothi is a moth in the subfamily Arctiinae. It is found in Nigeria.

References

Natural History Museum Lepidoptera generic names catalog

Endemic fauna of Nigeria
Arctiini